"Sola" is a song by Colombian singer J Balvin. It was released as the third single from his first studio album La Familia (2013) on June 12, 2013. The song incorporates the sound of traditional reggaeton and R&B. "Sola" became fifth number-one hit in Colombia (National-Report) chart.

Background 
"Sola" was written by J Balvin, composed by Sky, a DJ from Medellín and recorded in Miami and his native Medellín. In an interview with El Espectador, Balvin was asked about the production and the intention of the song. He said "Is a commercial rap designed for the clubs... the lyrics aren’t vulgar, it is about the call that one is waiting to go out and have a good time". "Sola" is a rap, featuring a melodic chorus, very close to R&B.

Chart performance 
The song debuted at number 5 on the National-Report Top 100 chart for the week of June 10, 2013. Three more weeks, the song topped the chart for two consecutive weeks, replacing "Bailar Contigo" by Colombian singer Carlos Vives and being succeeded by the same song, the following week. In Venezuela, the song debuted and peaked at number 100 on the Record Report Top 100 chart and peaked at number 28 on the Top Latino chart.

Track listing

Charts

Certifications

See also 
 List of number-one songs of 2013 (Colombia)

References 

 

2013 singles
2013 songs
J Balvin songs
Number-one singles in Colombia
Spanish-language songs
Capitol Latin singles
Songs written by J Balvin